Andrew Robert Tudor Davies CBE (born 1968) is a Welsh politician serving as Leader of the Welsh Conservative Group in the Senedd since 2021, previously holding the position from 2011 to 2018. He has been a Member of the Senedd (MS) since 2007.

He was elected Leader of the Welsh Conservatives in the Senedd on 14 July 2011, resigning the position on 27 June 2018. He was re-appointed as Welsh Conservative leader on 24 January 2021, following the resignation of Paul Davies.

Background
Davies was educated at Llanfair Primary School, St John's Preparatory School, Porthcawl, and later boarded at Wycliffe College, Stroud. He is married to a qualified midwife and they have four children. He is a partner in the family farming business based in St Hilary near Cowbridge in the Vale of Glamorgan. Davies was a Welsh delegate on the Council of the National Farmers Union (NFU), vice-president of the local Young Farmers Club, and is a former Chairman of Creative Communities, which seeks to develop structural community development. Davies is also a life governor of the Royal Welsh Agricultural Society, and was the Society's Oxford Farming Conference Scholar in 2002.  He is a former governor at Llanfair Primary School.

Career

Early political career
Joining the Conservative Party in 1997, Davies fought Cardiff West in the 2001 general election, and Brecon and Radnorshire in 2005. He served as Deputy Chairman (Political) for the Conservative Party in South Wales Central from 2002 to 2003, a region that comprises the Conservative Associations in Cardiff, Rhondda Cynon Taff and the Vale of Glamorgan. Between 2004 and 2005 he was Deputy Chairman of the Cardiff West Conservative Association. In 2007, he was elected to the National Assembly of Wales on the South Wales Central regional list. Davies' political interests include education, health and rural affairs.

In the Third Assembly he was appointed Shadow Minister for Transport in the Senedd from 7 July 2007 to 16 June 2008, and Shadow Minister for Education, Lifelong Learning and Skills from 16 June 2008. He also sat on the Assembly's Petitions Committee and the Subordinate Legislation Committee. In 2009 he became the Shadow Minister for Health in the National Assembly for Wales. He has also won an award for being "Assembly Member to Watch" in December 2008.

First leadership of the Welsh Conservative Group

He was elected as Leader of the Welsh Conservative Group on 14 July 2011, having won 53.1 per cent of the vote.

In June 2018, Wales Online led an investigation into what they described as Davies keeping his "public constituency office hidden from the public". The piece stated the office was located in a "wooden cabin 50 yards beyond a vehicle security barrier on a rural farm estate". In a freedom of information response by the Assembly Commission, the address of the office was confirmed as Penllyn Estate, Llwynhelig, Cowbridge CF71 7FF, a 1,200-acre mixed farm operation. The information only came to light after the FOI request by a Conservative Party member. A spokesperson for Davies responded to the investigation by stating the arrangements had been made "following a security incident at Andrew’s previous office on Cowbridge High Street where police attended to support a female employee", necessitating a more secure location. They continued stating that "Andrew regularly hosts constituents and organisations at his office and if he knew a Western Mail journalist had intended to visit he would’ve been there to welcome him with the kettle on".

Davies led criticism of Natural Resources Wales in November 2018, particularly around their selling of timber on a closed rather than open market. He has proposed splitting NRW into two separate bodies, and described the "bloated and largely incompetent quango" body as "no longer fit for purpose". Plaid agriculture spokesman Llyr Gruffydd however stated the issues faced by NRW were down to the 35% real terms cut in their budget and the organisation being under resourced.

Resignation 
Davies responded to concerns raised by Airbus in June 2018 regarding the threat of a no-deal Brexit by stating that "there is a lot of hyperbole flying around" regarding a no deal Brexit. The comments were criticised by Conservative figures including Guto Bebb. Bebb went on to dispute Davies title as "Leader of the Welsh Conservatives", stating he only led the Assembly group. Secretary of State Alun Cairns described Airbus' comments as a "wake-up call" for "one of the jewels in the crown of UK manufacturing". A number of Davies' Welsh Conservative colleagues, including Secretary of State Alun Cairns, Mr Davies' Deputy, Paul Davies, and Monmouth AM Nick Ramsay, were all Remain supporters, in contrast to Davies role as a Vote Leave voice in the Welsh Conservatives.

In Spring 2018, a text was reportedly sent by Cairns which discussed with Welsh Conservative AMs how and when to remove Davies. Davies initially only stated that a figure in Westminster had sent the text, but refused to name the individual. This text was reportedly sent to Davies by accident, describing how "the other end of the M4" were in support of his replacement.

In around April 2018, it was rumoured that his Deputy Leader Paul Davies was planning a leadership challenge to Davies. Amid internal discussions in the party, Nick Ramsay reportedly made it clear to Mr Davies that they did not like each other prior to his resignation, and an AM reportedly "stormed out" of a dinner regarding the leadership of the party after Davies had spoken, who later was reported to be Ramsay.

Davies resigned as Leader of the Welsh Conservatives on 27 June 2018. A source close to Davies described the events at the time as "the revenge of Tory Remainers who can’t forgive him for going against Cameron and campaigning for a Leave vote in the Brexit referendum." Davies resignation was viewed by some in the media as sparked by Davies' "inflammatory remarks" towards Airbus. Sources close to Davies however spoke to the media and stated they felt he had been victim of "a plot to get rid of him for "seven or eight weeks" dating back to his controversial "decision to back a Leave vote in the 2016 Brexit referendum" which came against the wishes of then Prime Minister David Cameron, who had backed Remain.

Inter-leadership career
In 2019, Davies was reported by Wales Online as having the highest budget for constituency office spending of any AM in the five Assembly political groups, with a spend of £102,655, including £35,182 for a salary for his wife Julia. Davies did not respond to requests for comments in the piece.

In a June 2019 op-ed on Nation.Cymru, Davies stated his top wishes from an incoming Conservative Prime Minister for Wales would be:

 A "shared prosperity fund" replacing the Joint Ministerial Committee.
 A "significant investment in Welsh infrastructure projects" to make up for previous rejections including the M4 Relief Road and tidal lagoon, through a "Green Deal".
 A "broadband revolution".
 The "devolution of air passenger duty" for Cardiff Airport.
 The restructuring of the Wales Office.
 Welsh representation on national and cross border bodies, to respond to the issues such as where the Countess of Chester hospital rejected Welsh patients.
 Welsh figures on regulators such as OFGEM, OFCOM, and Ofwat.

Following the storming of the United States Capitol by supporters of Donald Trump on 6 January 2021, Davies was criticised for comparing the riot to other British politicians' opposition to Brexit.

Second leadership of the Welsh Conservative Group
He was appointed as Leader of the Welsh Conservatives Group on 24 January 2021, following the resignation of Paul Davies, after a scandal involving possible breaches of Welsh COVID-19 regulations.

In a July 2021 op-ed for Mail+, Davies accused the Welsh media of being "in hock to the nationalist agenda". He wrote: "This is what's in store for us in the Senedd over the next five years: listening to Labour ministers regurgitate historically ignorant, politically extreme ideas and a demonstrably poor understanding of sovereignty in Britain as they call for a federalist system that will only serve to worsen, not solve, the issues present in Wales."

Stance on Brexit and its impact on Wales
During the Brexit referendum campaign, Davies suggested Wales would be better off financially outside the European Union, stating that if the UK voted to leave, it could mean "Wales could be as much as half a billion pounds a year better off".

In a July 2016 interview with WalesOnline, Davies insisted that, as a result of Brexit "Wales must not lose a penny of the money that has historically flowed into Wales". However, after the referendum, the Secretary of State for Wales Alun Cairns, confirmed that the UK Government would in fact reduce the amount allocated for Wales (which the European Union had earmarked at £1.9 billion for the period 2014 to 2020).

In the run-up to the UK's invocation of Article 50 of the Treaty on European Union, Davies claimed that the Welsh Government should be denied the right to be part of Brexit negotiations on devolved areas.

Despite his firm anti-EU stance, Davies' family firm TJ Davies and Sons had accepted a total of £96,808.89 in EU subsidies over the period 16 October 2013 to 15 October 2014 alone, including £70,930.63 allocated under the Single Area payment scheme, £24,099.86 in agro-environmental payments, and £1,728.40 from the first Afforestation of Agricultural Land scheme. Commenting on the revelation of these figures, Britain Stronger in Europe spokesman James McGrory said "taking money from Europe while saying we should leave is hypocrisy of the first order."

In September 2019, Davies criticised proposals by the Liberal Democrats, Labour, and other parties which would force Prime Minister Boris Johnson to seek an extension to Article 50 if it prevented a no deal exit from the European Union. He described the avoidance of Brexit on 31 October as a "betrayal of democracy". He criticised First Minister Mark Drakeford for recalling the Welsh Assembly to debate Brexit, stating that the decision would "achieve nothing", and joined Conservative ministers in voting against a motion criticising the UK Government's handling of a no deal exit.

Vale of Glamorgan Council
Davies was elected as a County Councillor for Rhoose in a by-election on 14 February 2019, and claims a salary of £13,868 before expenses, alongside his salary as a Senedd Member.

Honours 
Davies was made a Commander of the Order of British Empire (CBE) in the 2020 New Year Honours, "for political and public service".

References

External links

Andrew RT Davies MS on the Senedd website
Conservative Party candidates profile, 2005 general election.

1968 births
Living people
Conservative Party members of the Senedd
Wales AMs 2007–2011
Wales AMs 2011–2016
Wales MSs 2016–2021
Welsh farmers
People from Cowbridge
Commanders of the Order of the British Empire
Conservative Party (UK) parliamentary candidates
Wales MSs 2021–2026